Rimisia miris is a species of butterfly in the family Lycaenidae. It is the sole representative of the monotypic genus Rimisia.

References

External links

Polyommatini